Vitaliy Kazymyrovych Buyalskyi (born 6 January 1993) is a Ukrainian professional footballer who plays as a midfielder for Dynamo Kyiv and the Ukraine national team.

Club career

Dynamo Kyiv
After playing for some time for Dynamo Kyiv youth teams, Buyalskyi made his senior team debut on 21 September 2011, playing the last five minutes in the Ukrainian Cup away match against FC Kremin Kremenchuk. His next appearance for Dynamo had to wait until 26 May 2013, when he made his Ukrainian Premier League debut against Metalurh Zaporizhya.

The following season saw Buyalskyi go on a successful loan spell to Hoverla Uzhhorod, where he played in 20 games. Upon returning to Dynamo for the 2014–15 season, Buyalskyi was given a much larger role than before, featuring in a total of 23 matches, including 7 appearances in that season's edition of the UEFA Europa League.

On 16 September 2015, Buyalskyi made his UEFA Champions League debut in a 2–2 draw against Portuguese club Porto in the group stage. He also scored his first-ever goal in the competition in the 89th minute which gave Dynamo the draw.

On 21 July 2018, Buyalskyi scored the only goal of the game as Dynamo defeated rivals Shakhtar Donetsk in the 2018 Ukrainian Super Cup.

In February 2021, Buyalskyi scored in both leg's of Dynamo's UEFA Europa League Round of 32 clash against Belgian side Club Brugge to lead his side to a 2–1 aggregate victory and secure passage into the last 16. On 21 April 2021, Buyalskyi scored his first ever goal in the Ukrainian Cup as Dynamo defeated second division club Ahrobiznes Volochysk 3–0 in the semi-final. Dynamo would eventually go on to defeat Zorya Luhansk in the final to earn the league and cup double.

International career
Buyalskyi was named in the 31-player senior national squad for the 2018 FIFA World Cup qualification match against Iceland on 5 September 2016. He made his debut on 6 October 2017 at Loro Boriçi Stadium in Shkodër, Albania, as a late substitute in Ukraine's 2–0 FIFA World Cup qualifying victory over Kosovo.

Career statistics

Club

International

Honours 
Dynamo Kyiv
Ukrainian Premier League: 2014–15, 2015–16, 2020–21
Ukrainian Cup: 2014–15, 2019–20, 2020–21
Ukrainian Super Cup: 2016, 2018, 2019, 2020

References

External links 
 
 Vitaliy Buyalskyi at Topforward
 

1993 births
Living people
People from Kalynivka
Ukrainian footballers
Piddubny Olympic College alumni
Ukrainian Premier League players
FC Dynamo Kyiv players
FC Hoverla Uzhhorod players
Association football midfielders
Ukraine international footballers
Sportspeople from Vinnytsia Oblast